Anantrao Patil (Marathi: अनंतराव पाटील) ( 22 Nov 1921 – 16 April 2008) was a Member of Parliament and Congress Leader from Pune, India. He was Member of Parliament (MP) for the Khed Lok Sabha constituency in Maharashtra  for second time from 1971 to 1977 and earlier from Ahmednagar during 1967–1970. He was also a member of the Press Council of India from 1 October 1970 – 27 December 1970 and 7 January 1972 – 31 December 1975.

Anantrao Patil worked as Chief Editor of the Indian National Congress Party Journal in Pune. He also wrote a biography of Yashwantrao Chavan.

References

Indian political journalists
1921 births
India MPs 1971–1977
India MPs 1967–1970
People from Pune district
People from Ahmednagar district
2008 deaths
Lok Sabha members from Maharashtra
People from Pimpri-Chinchwad
Journalists from Maharashtra
20th-century Indian journalists
Indian National Congress politicians from Maharashtra